Wang Yoo-sun (born February 11, 1976), known professionally as Yoo Sun, is a South Korean actress. She is best known for the popular family drama My Too Perfect Sons, as well as the films Black House, Moss, GLove, and Don't Cry Mommy.

Filmography

Film

Television series

Web series

Variety/radio show

Theatre

Awards and nominations

References

External links 
 
 
 

20th-century South Korean actresses
21st-century South Korean actresses
South Korean television actresses
South Korean film actresses
South Korean stage actresses
Korea National University of Arts alumni
1976 births
Living people